Pigritia haha is a moth in the family Blastobasidae. It is found in Costa Rica.

The length of the forewings is 3.9–4.9 mm. The forewings are pale brown intermixed with greyish-brown scales or brownish-orange scales. The hindwings are translucent pale brown, gradually darkening towards the apex.

Etymology
The specific name is derived from Latin ha, hahae or hahahae (meaning an exclamation of joy or amusement).

References

Moths described in 2013
Blastobasidae